These are the results of 2017 BWF World Senior Championships' 70+ events.

Men's singles

Seeds
 Jim Garrett (champion, gold medal)
 Yoshio Terasaki (final, silver medal)
 Paweł Gasz (semifinals, bronze medal)
 Roger Baldwin (quarterfinals)
 Ching Kon Kong (second round)
 Knud Danielsen (third round)
 Akira Hirota (quarterfinals)
 Venugopal Menon (second round)

Finals

Top half

Section 1

Section 2

Bottom half

Section 3

Section 4

Women's singles

Seeds
 Elvira Richter (champion, gold medal)
 Satoko Nakamura (semifinals, bronze medal)

Group A

Group B

Group C

Group D

Finals

Men's doubles

Seeds
 Ching Kon Kong / Loo Ah Hooi (semifinals, bronze medal)
 Jim Garrett / Ray Sharp (final, silver medal)
 Masaki Furuhashi / Yoshio Terasaki (semifinals, bronze medal)
 Akira Hirota / Shinjiro Matsuda (champions, gold medal)

Finals

Top half

Section 1

Section 2

Bottom half

Section 3

Section 4

Women's doubles

Seeds
 Beryl Goodall / Mary Jenner (final, silver medal)
 Susan Awcock / Victoria Betts (semifinals, bronze medal)

Group A

Group B

Finals

Mixed doubles

Seeds
 Roger Baldwin / Victoria Betts (semifinals, bronze medal)
 Jim Garrett / Susan Awcock (champions, gold medal)
 Knud Danielsen / Margrethe Danielsen (semifinals, bronze medal)
 John Whalebone / Beryl Goodall (quarterfinals)

Finals

Top half

Section 1

Section 2

Bottom half

Section 3

Section 4

References

Men's singles
Results

Women's singles
Group A Results
Group B Results
Group C Results
Group D Results
Finals Results

Men's doubles
Results

Women's doubles
Group A Results
Group B Results
Finals Results

Mixed doubles
Results

2017 BWF World Senior Championships